is a Japanese composer, arranger and orchestrator best known for his work in anime and video games. He is affiliated with the music production company Imagine.

Biography
Inai was born in Hiroshima, Japan. He studied at the Toho Gakuen School of Music, but dropped out to pursue studio work. In 1999, while he was a college student, he served as assistant musical director to violinist Toshihiro Nakanishi on the Akira Shirai production Falstaff. In 2001 and 2002 he participated as a pianist, manipulator, and arranger on the soundtracks for the Fuji TV dramas Fighting Girl and Hatsu Taiken. After this, he began working as a composer for television programs, commercials, movies, games, radio programs, fashion shows and other areas.

Discography

Anime works

Game works

Movie works

TV works

References

External links
 Keiji Inai's Imagine Profile 
 Keiji Inai discography at VGMdb
 

1976 births
Anime composers
Japanese composers
Japanese film score composers
Japanese male composers
Japanese male film score composers
Japanese male musicians
Japanese music arrangers
Living people
Musicians from Hiroshima
Video game composers